Poul Erik "Popper" Petersen (7 May 1927 – 14 October 1992) was a Danish amateur association football player, who played for Køge Boldklub in Denmark. He was the top goalscorer of the 1952 Danish football championship. He played 15 games and scored six goals for the Denmark national football team. He represented Denmark at the 1952 Summer Olympics.

References

External links
Danish national team profile

1927 births
1992 deaths
Danish men's footballers
Denmark international footballers
Køge Boldklub players
Footballers at the 1952 Summer Olympics
Olympic footballers of Denmark
Association football forwards